I Need You Tonight may refer to:

"I Need You Tonight" (Professor Green song)
"I Need You Tonight" (Junior M.A.F.I.A. song)
"I Need You Tonight", a song by James Morrison from the album Higher Than Here
"I Need You Tonight", a song by ZZ Top from the album Eliminator